Khenavin (also Romanized as Khenāvīn and Khanāvīn) is a village in Shepiran Rural District, Kuhsar District, Salmas County, West Azerbaijan Province, Iran. At the 2006 census, its population was 424, in 70 families.

References 

Populated places in Salmas County